Romulo Cincinato or Cincinnato (1502 – c. 1593) was an Italian painter of the Renaissance period, active in Spain after 1567. His two sons, Diego and Francisco Romulo were painters in Spain.

Biography
Born in Florence, he was recruited by the Spanish Ambassador to the Holy See in Rome, and commended to Philip II, king of Spain. An altar-piece representing the Circumcision in the Jesuits' Church at Cuenca was his master-piece. He was accompanied by Patricio Caxes of Arezzo, who painted much in the Pardo. Cincinato also painted for the Escorial.

References

External links
 Scholarly articles in English about Romulo Cincinato both in web and PDF @ the Spanish Old Masters Gallery

16th-century Spanish painters
Spanish male painters
1502 births
16th-century Italian painters
Italian male painters
Renaissance painters
Painters from Florence
1590s deaths